Horus Heresy is a board game released in 2010 by games publisher Fantasy Flight Games for 2 players. The board game is set in the fictional Horus Heresy, with one player controlling the loyal faction and the other controlling the rebels.

References

Board games introduced in 2010
Fantasy Flight Games games